Hyponerita hamoia is a moth of the subfamily Arctiinae. It was described by James John Joicey and George Talbot in 1916. It is found in Colombia.

References

 

Phaegopterina
Moths described in 1916